In Greek mythology, Gorgophone (Ancient Greek: Γοργοφόνη) was a queen of Messenia and Sparta. Her name means "Gorgon Slayer", a tribute to her father Perseus who killed Medusa, the mortal Gorgon.

Biography 
Gorgophone as one of the Perseids, was the daughter of Perseus and Andromeda. She was the sister of Perses, Alcaeus, Heleus, Mestor, Sthenelus of Mycenae, Electryon, Cynurus and Autochthe.

Gorgophone was a prominent figure in the mythical history of Sparta, having been married to two kings, Oebalus of Laconia and Perieres of Messenia, and being considered the first woman to have married twice. After the death of her first husband Perieres by whom she had sons, Aphareus, Leucippus, Tyndareus, Icarius and possibly Pisus, Gorgophone took Oebalus as her second spouse and by him she begat a daughter Arene and some say, of Tyndareus also.

Perseus' descendants played a central role in the Homeric epics and the legendary pre-history of Greece through Gorgophone's children, Tyndareus who became the mortal father of Helen of Troy, Clytemnestra, Castor and Pollux, Timandra, and Phoebe and another son Icarius, father of Odysseus's wife; Penelope. Gorgophone was said to be buried in Argos.

Notes

References 
 Apollodorus, The Library with an English Translation by Sir James George Frazer, F.B.A., F.R.S. in 2 Volumes, Cambridge, MA, Harvard University Press; London, William Heinemann Ltd. 1921. ISBN 0-674-99135-4. Online version at the Perseus Digital Library. Greek text available from the same website.
 Pausanias, Description of Greece with an English Translation by W.H.S. Jones, Litt.D., and H.A. Ormerod, M.A., in 4 Volumes. Cambridge, MA, Harvard University Press; London, William Heinemann Ltd. 1918. . Online version at the Perseus Digital Library
Pausanias, Graeciae Descriptio. 3 vols. Leipzig, Teubner. 1903.  Greek text available at the Perseus Digital Library.

Perseid dynasty
Princesses in Greek mythology
Queens in Greek mythology
Argive characters in Greek mythology
Laconian mythology
Messenian mythology